Francisco Rivera is the name of:

 Frank Rivera (athlete) (Francisco Rivera Paniagua; born 1928), Puerto Rican sprinter and middle-distance runner
 Francisco Rivera (footballer)
 Paquirri (Francisco Rivera Pérez; 1948–1984), Spanish bullfighter
 Francisco Rivera Ordóñez (born 1974), Spanish bullfighter, son of Paquirri
 Francisco Rivera (fighter) (born 1981), American mixed martial artist
 Francisco X. Rivera, bilingual sportscaster 
 Francisco Israel Rivera (born 1994), Mexican footballer
 Francisco Rosa Rivera (1972–2010), Puerto Rican bodybuilder